The Pleurotremataceae are a family of fungi in the Ascomycota phylum. This family can not yet be taxonomically classified in any of the ascomycetous classes and orders with any degree of certainty (incertae sedis).

See also
 List of Ascomycota families incertae sedis

References

External links
Index Fungorum

Ascomycota enigmatic taxa